Ali Baba and the Forty Thieves (French: Ali Baba et les 40 voleurs) is a 1954 French comedy film directed by  Jacques Becker and starring Fernandel, Samia Gamal and Dieter Borsche.

It was made at the Billancourt Studios in Paris. The film's sets were designed by Georges Wakhévitch. Some scenes were shot on location in French Morocco.

Cast 
 Fernandel as Ali Baba  
 Samia Gamal as Morgiane  
 Dieter Borsche  as Abdel, bandit chief  
 Henri Vilbert as Cassim  
 Édouard Delmont as Père de Morgiane  
 Edmond Ardisson as Mendiant  
 Manuel Gary as Mendiant  
 Julien Maffre as Mendiant  
 Leopoldo Francés 
 Gaston Orbal as Mufti  
 Bob Ingarao as Un bandit  
 Yôko Tani 
 Fanfan Minucci 
 José Casa as Mendiant  
 Abdelhaq Chraibi 
 Mohamed Gabsi 
 Piella Sorano 
 Micheline Gary
 Abdelkader Belkhodja as Mendiant

References

Bibliography 
 Lieve Spaas. Francophone Film: A Struggle for Identity. Manchester University Press, 2000.

External links 
 

1954 films
1954 comedy films
French comedy films
1950s French-language films
Films directed by Jacques Becker
Films shot in Morocco
Films shot at Billancourt Studios
Films based on Ali Baba
1950s French films